Robert Grodt (February 23, 1989 – July 6, 2017) was an American anarchist and street medic, best known for his involvement with the Occupy Wall Street movement (2011) and his participation and death in the Battle of Raqqa (2017), for the YPG.

In Rojava he took the pseudonym Demhat Goldman in tribute to the anarcha-feminist Emma Goldman. At his funeral, several western anarchist fighters were orators. On the way to the cemetery was accompanied with an anarchist flag.

He is survived by his daughter, Tegan Grodt.

References

Further reading 

 
 

1989 births
2017 deaths
International Freedom Battalion
Occupy Wall Street
Foreigners killed in the Syrian civil war
American anarchists